La Leyenda (English: The Legend) is the name of the third box set from the Tejano pop singer Selena that was released by Capitol Latin/EMI and Q-Productions labels. The album was released on March 9, 2010. This box set was released in three formats: a four-disc box set, a two-disc special-edition album, and a single-disc album. According to Suzette Quintanilla's YouTube video, EMI teamed up with Q-Productions (a division of Selena's father's recording studio) to release this box set, and Quintanilla asks Selena fans around the world to contribute a special message to Selena that may or may not be included in the new box set. The Box-sets will contain an exclusive "Selena" charm and four booklets that include messages from Selena's family, friends, and fans from around the world. Selena fans around the world were told to collaborate pictures of themselves to be part of the La Leyenda bound books, but in early February 2010, Q-Productions and Capitol Latin decided to cancel the transaction due to legal actions with copyrighted images from fans.

Background and production
In October 2009, EMI teamed up with Q-Productions for the box set and agreed on releasing the album in three different formats: one four disc box set, two special edition albums, and a single disc album. In mid-October 2009, Selena's sister released a public video about this project in which she reached out to the fans to contribute a special message for Selena that may or may not be used for this album's release.

Around early December 2009, the video for the information was later gone from the site but still exists on YouTube. It stated in the video that there aren't enough space for every Selena fan that they must submit a message that included all lower case letters, and the submitter may include a photo of themselves.

In mid-December 2009, the album name, La Leyenda was released to the public by Amazon.com's selling market. There the three formats were given but no track list has been announced.

The albums was released on March 9, 2010, as verified by Amazon.com. The release marks the fifteenth anniversary of Selena's death, after being killed on March 31, 1995.

Release and promotion
In April 2009, Univision Network released a Selena special entirely in Spanish called Selena: La Historia de una Leyenda (Selena: The History of a Legend) and again during the last week of November 2009, Univision released the video, this special was a preview to the upcoming DVD "Johnny Canales presenta Selena" planned to be released the fall of 2010 by Q-Productions.

As told in the video, Selena's fans will have a big part in being publicly viewed on the box set. Q-Productions released a press release on January 12, 2010, describing the box set's formats.

In early February 2010, Selena's family released an all exclusive YouTube page titled SelenaLaLeyenda and the videos on their channels revealed, A.B. Quintanilla, DJ Kane, and Alejandra Guzmán's personal messages for Selena.

On February 24, 2010, a promotional ad was released by Amazon.com promoting the album in all major websites including, Google.com and Yahoo.com. On February 25, 2010, Amazon.com ads for the La Leyenda box-set were released internationally on all major social websites like MySpace, Facebook, and Twitter, there has been promotional ads on international sites of MySpace and Facebook, as well. Continually, the promotion has caught eyes for all Wikipedia projects as well as Wiki Music Guide which frequently reveals the album.

On February 27, 2010, Wal-Mart officials stated promotion for the box set will begin once the album is officially released on March 9, 2010 in all stores in Texas. To assist the album's promotion, a Selena biography, which was provided by Macrovision Corporation, has become available at the Wal-Mart website. The superstore will also be giving out a free promotional poster of Selena along with the La Leyenda four disc box-set to any customer who bought their copy at any participating Wal-Mart stores.

Q-Productions (which is Selena's recording studio) has released its version of their promotional banner which is displayed on their web-site. Q, also has the Amazon promotional banner on their web-site and on the Selena official MySpace and Twitter.

The Selena La Leyenda posters are provided by Allposters.com who are in partnership with providing some limited free posters for Wal-Mart.

Reception

Allmusic writer Stephen Thomas Erlewine gave the album 4 out of 5 stars and stated "This set is designed to illustrate her range, and it does it well even if some hardcore fans may find some quibbles with the song selection".

Track listings
Capitol Latin/EMI and Q-Productions have released a full line press release regarding the box set. La Leyenda gathers Selena's top hits and fan favorites for a career-spanning celebration of her vibrant music and life.

4 Disc Deluxe Edition
The box set includes 82 tracks on four CDs, grouped by musical style, language and cover versions

Disc 1 (Cumbias & Pop)
"Amor Prohibido"
"Baila Esta Cumbia"
"La Carcacha"
"Besitos"
"Como La Flor"
"El Chico Del Apartamento 512"
"La Llamada"
"Bidi Bidi Bom Bom"
"Quiero Ser"
"Si Una Vez"
"No Debes Jugar"
"Techno Cumbia"
"Costumbres"
"Fotos Y Recuerdos"
"No Quiero Saber"
"Enamorada de Tí"
"Tú Robaste Mi Corazón" (duet with Emilio Navaira)
"Ya No"
"No Te Vayas"
"Amame"
"Aunque No Salga El Sol"
"Puede Ser" (duet with Nando "Guero" Domínguez)
"Sukiyaki"
"Buenos Amigos" (duet with Álvaro Torres)

Disc 2 (Tejano & Rancheras)
"Contigo Quiero Estar"
"Amame, Quiéreme"
"Ya Ves"
"Mentiras"
"La Tracalera"
"Cobarde"
"Si La Quieres"
"Tus Desprecios"
"Yo Te Sigo Queriendo"
"Ven Conmigo"
"Las Cadenas"
"Vuelve A Mi"
"Siempre Estoy Pensando En Ti"
"Yo Te Amo" (Live)
"Yo Me Voy"
"Despues De Enero"
"Dame Un Beso"
"Tengo Ganas De Llorar"
"Tu Eres"
"Tú Sólo Tú"
"El Toro Relajo"
"Siempre Hace Frio"
"¿Qué Creias?"
"No Me Queda Más"

Disc 3 (English rhythm and blues crossover music)
"I Could Fall in Love"
"My Love"
"Missing My Baby"
"Captive Heart"
"I'm Getting Used To You"
"God's Child (Baila Conmigo)" (duet with David Byrne)
"Dreaming of You"
"Wherever You Are (Donde Quiera Que Estés)" (duet with Barrio Boyzz)
"Only Love"
"A Million to One"
"Is It the Beat?"
"Where Did the Feeling Go?"
"A Boy Like That"
"Always Mine"
"I'm Getting Used To You" (Def Club Mix) [bonus track]
"Don't Throw Away My Love" [bonus track]

Disc 4 (Live)
"Disco Medley" (I Will Survive/Funkytown/Last Dance/The Hustle/On the Radio)
"Amame, Quiéreme/Siempre Estoy Pensando En Ti"
"Amor Prohibido"
"Baila Esta Cumbia"
"No Me Queda Más"
"El Chico Del Apartamento 512"
"Si La Quieres"
"Bidi Bidi Bom Bom"
"Si Una Vez"
"Ya Ves"
"¿Qué Creias?"
"Tus Desprecios"
"Cobarde"
"Techno Cumbia"
"La Carcacha"
"Ven Conmigo/Perdoname"
"Como La Flor"
"Como Te Extraño" (Pete Astudillo) [bonus track]

2 Disc Special Edition
Disc 1
"Amor Prohibido"
"Besitos"
"Baila Esta Cumbia"
"La Carcacha"
"Como La Flor"
"No Debes Jugar"
"La Llamada"
"Bidi Bidi Bom Bom"
"Si Una Vez"
"El Chico Del Apartamento 512"
"Techno Cumbia"
"Costumbres"
"Fotos Y Recuerdos"
"Contigo Quiero Estar"
"Amame, Quiéreme"

Disc 2
"I Could Fall in Love"
"Only Love"
"Dreaming of You"
"I'm Getting Used To You"
"Where Did the Feeling Go?"
"Is It the Beat?"
"Buenos Amigos" (duet with Álvaro Torres)
"Aunque No Salga El Sol"
"No Quiero Saber"
"¿Qué Creias?"
"No Me Queda Más"
"Tú Sólo Tú"
"El Toro Relajo"
"Siempre Hace Frio"
"Como Te Extraño" (Pete Astudillo)

Single Disc Edition
"Bidi Bidi Bom Bom"
"La Llamada"
"Amor Prohibido"
"Como La Flor"
"No Me Queda Más"
"La Carcacha"
"Fotos Y Recuerdos"
"I Could Fall in Love"
"Tú Sólo Tú"
"Dreaming of You"
"Techno Cumbia"
"No Quiero Saber"
"El Chico Del Apartamento 512"
"Baila Esta Cumbia"
"Buenos Amigos" (duet with Álvaro Torres)

Charts

Certifications

Release dates

References

2010 greatest hits albums
2010 live albums
Selena compilation albums
Albums produced by A.B. Quintanilla
Albums produced by David Byrne
Capitol Latin compilation albums
EMI Records compilation albums
Spanish-language compilation albums
Compilation albums published posthumously
Albums recorded at Q-Productions